Lady's Bridge or similar terms may refer to:

 Lady's Bridge, a bridge in Sheffield, England
 Lady's Bridge (album) (2007), by Richard Hawley
 Ladysbridge, County Cork, Ireland, a village
 Ladysbridge railway station, near Banff, Aberdeenshire, Scotland
 Ladysbridge Hospital, near Banff, Aberdeenshire, Scotland, a mental health facility
 Ladybridge High School, Bolton, England
 Waterloo Bridge, a bridge in London, England

See also
 Women's Bridge (disambiguation)